is a former Japanese badminton player. She was the women's singles national champion in 2001 and 2003. Mori won the bronze medal at the 2004 Asian Championships and also the silver medals in 2005 and 2006. She played badminton at the 2004 Summer Olympics, defeating Anu Weckström of Finland in the first round but losing to Zhou Mi of China in the round of 16. She also helps the Japanese women's team to win bronze at the 2004 Uber Cup in Jakarta, Indonesia.

Achievements

Asia Championships
Women's singles

BWF International Challenge/Series (1 title, 4 runners-up)
Women's singles

Women's doubles

 BWF International Challenge tournament
 BWF International Series tournament

References

External links 
 

Living people
1979 births
Sportspeople from Fukuoka Prefecture
Japanese female badminton players
Badminton players at the 2004 Summer Olympics
Olympic badminton players of Japan
Asian Games medalists in badminton
Asian Games silver medalists for Japan
Badminton players at the 2006 Asian Games
Badminton players at the 2002 Asian Games
Medalists at the 2006 Asian Games